Keiji (けいじ, ケイジ) is a Japanese given name usually used for males.  Meaning varies depending on the kanji characters used.

Possible writings
Common kanji used include:

 啓司
 啓治
 圭二
 圭司
 慶次
 慶治
 敬二
 敬治
 佳司
 佳次

People with the name
 Keiji Fukuda (福田 敬二)
 Keiji Fujiwara (藤原 啓治)
 Keiji Furuya (古屋 圭司)
 Keiji Gotoh (後藤 圭二)
 Keiji Haino (灰野 敬二)
, Japanese swimmer
 Keiji Hirose (廣瀬 佳司)
 Keiji Inafune (稲船 敬二)
 Keiji Ishizuka (石塚 啓次)
 Keiji Kaimoto (海本 慶治)
 Keiji Kawamori (河盛 慶次)
 Keiji Koizumi
 Keiji Kokuta (穀田 恵二)
 Kotomitsuki Keiji (琴光喜 啓司)
Keiji Kuroki (黒木 啓司)
 Keiji Honda (本多圭司)
 Keiji Nakazawa (中沢 啓治)
 Maeda Keiji (前田 慶次) (AKA Maeda Toshimasu)
, Japanese racing driver
 Keiji Mutoh (武藤 敬司)
, Japanese shogi player
 Keiji Nishitani (西谷 啓治)
 Keiji Obiki (大引 啓次)
, Japanese sport wrestler
 Keiji Ozaki (尾崎 圭司)
 Keiji Sada (佐田 啓二)
 Keiji Sakoda (aka Ryan Sakoda)
 Keiji Shibazaki (柴崎 恵次)
, Japanese speed skater
 Keiji Suzuki (鈴木 桂治)
 Keiji Tachikawa (立川 敬二)
 Keiji Takachi (高地 系治)
, Japanese baseball player
 Keiji Takayama (高山 圭司)
 Keiji Tamada (玉田 圭司)
 Keiji Ueshima (植島 啓司)
 Keiji Watanabe (渡邊 圭二)
 Keiji Yamada (山田 啓二)
 Keiji Yoshimura (吉村 圭司)
Keiji Tanaka (田中 刑事), a Japanese figure skater
Keiji Nakazawa (中澤 圭二), a Japanese Sushi master

Fictional characters with the name
Keiji Shinogi, a character from Your Turn to Die (video game).
Keiji Akaashi (赤葦 京治), a character from Haikyu!! with the position of setter from Fukurodani Academy
Keiji Shibusawa, a character from  Yakuza 0

See also
 Keiji (manga), a fictionalized account of Maeda Keiji
 Fugo Keiji (富豪刑事), detective mystery drama

Japanese masculine given names